Eucidaris is a genus of cidaroid sea urchins known as slate pencil urchins. They are characterised by a moderately thick test, a usually monocyclic apical disc, perforate and non-crenulate tubercles and nearly straight ambulacra with horizontal pore pairs. The primary spines are few and widely spaced, stout with blunt flat tips and beaded ornamentation and the secondary spines are short and apressed. They originated in the Miocene and extant members of the genus are found in the tropical Indo-Pacific Ocean, East Pacific, Atlantic Ocean and Caribbean Sea.

Species
The World Register of Marine Species lists the following species:
 Eucidaris australiae Mortensen, 1950
 † Eucidaris coralloides Fell, 1954 
 Eucidaris galapagensis Döderlein, 1887
 Eucidaris metularia (Lamarck, 1816)
 † Eucidaris strobilata Fell, 1954 
 Eucidaris thouarsii (Agassiz & Desor, 1846)
 Eucidaris tribuloides (Lamarck, 1816)
Species brought into synonymy
 Eucidaris clavata Mortensen, 1928: synonym of Eucidaris tribuloides (Lamarck, 1816)

References

 Pomel, A. 1883. Classification méthodique et Genera des Échinides vivantes et fossiles. Thèses présentées à la Faculté des Sciences de Paris pour obtenir le Grade de Docteur ès Sciences Naturelles 503, Adolphe Jourdan, Alger, 131 pp

 
Cidaridae
Cidaroida genera